Samuel McAdam  (May 31, 1908 – December 29, 1976) was a Canadian professional ice hockey forward who played five games in the National Hockey League for the New York Rangers in 1930–31. He was a decent goal scorer who enjoyed a lengthy career in the minors, especially the Pacific Coast Hockey League. He was born in Stirling, Scotland, United Kingdom and raised in Winnipeg, Manitoba.

He died of a heart attack in 1976. At the time of his death he worked as a waiter in a hotel.

Awards and achievements
NWHL Second All-Star Team (1935)

See also
List of National Hockey League players from the United Kingdom

References

External links

1908 births
1976 deaths
Canadian ice hockey forwards
Elmwood Maple Leafs players
Elmwood Millionaires players
Ice hockey people from Winnipeg
New York Rangers players
Scottish emigrants to Canada
Winnipeg Hockey Club players
Winnipeg Tigers players